The Battle of Laï began on 21 August 1914 in Chad, during the First World War at the village of Laï, capital of the district of Logone, on the Logone River in the south.

A German column from Kamerun, led by Captain Von Duhring, attacked the village of Laï, defended by Captain Jeanjean. After a bitter fight, the French were driven out and the village was occupied by the Germans until 1 September 1914.

Sources

External links

 Timeline, 1914

Battles of World War I involving Germany
Battles of World War I involving France
1914 in Africa
African theatre of World War I
Battles of the African Theatre (World War I)
Military history of Cameroon
Kamerun
Battles of the Kamerun campaign
Military history of Chad
August 1914 events
1910s in Chad